Koh is a surname in various cultures. Its languages of origin include Chinese, German (via its Serbo-Croatian spelling), and Korean.

Origins
Koh may be a spelling of a number of Chinese surnames, listed below by their spelling in Hanyu Pinyin, which reflects the Standard Mandarin pronunciation:

Xǔ (/), spelled Koh based on its pronunciation in various Southern Min dialects. The surname is frequently spelled this way in Malaysia and Singapore, where many descendants of Chinese migrants can trace their roots to Southern Min-speaking areas of China, namely Fujian and eastern Guangdong. Other spellings of the Southern Min pronunciation include Co, Ko, and Kho.
Gāo, spelled Koh based on its Cantonese pronunciation
Gù (/), spelled Koh based on its pronunciation in various Southern Min dialects
Gū, spelled Koh based on its pronunciation in various Southern Min dialects
Gŭ, spelled Koh based on its pronunciation in various Southern Min dialects
Ke, spelled Koh based on its pronunciation in multiple varieties of Chinese including Hakka and Southern Min
Kòu, spelled Koh based on its pronunciation in multiple varieties of Chinese including Mandarin and Southern Min

The surname Koh found among descendants of the Germans of Yugoslavia originated from the German surname Koch. The surname Kuhač is similarly derived.

As a Korean surname, Koh is a variant spelling of the surname most commonly spelled as Ko (based on its McCune–Reischauer transcription). This surname, also spelled Go in the Revised Romanization of Korean, is written with a character meaning "high", the same one used for the Chinese surname Gāo mentioned above.

Statistics
Koh was the 10th-most common surname among ethnic Chinese in Singapore as of 1997 (ranked by English spelling, rather than by Chinese characters). Roughly 48,100 people, or 1.9% of the Chinese Singaporean population at the time, bore the surname Koh.

According to the 2000 South Korean census, there were 435,839 people in 135,488 households with the surname spelled Go in Revised Romanization. Among these, 325,950 people in 100,954 households were members of the Jeju Go clan. This surname is only infrequently spelled as Koh in South Korea: in a study based on a sample of applications for South Korean passports in 2007, 11.4% of applicants with this surname chose to spell it as Koh in the Latin alphabet, against 67.5% who chose to spell it as Ko, and 18.3% as Go.

The 2010 United States Census found 3,595 people with the surname Koh, making it the 9,090th-most-common name in the country. This represented an increase from 2,893 (10,226th-most-common) in the 2000 Census. In both censuses, slightly fewer than nine-tenths of the bearers of the surname identified Asian.

People

Classical music
Koh Bunya (1910–1983), Taiwanese composer educated in Japan, often known by the Japanese pronunciation of his Chinese name Chiang Wen-yeh
Vladimir Koh (born 1964), Serbian violinist
Joyce Beetuan Koh (born 1968), Singaporean composer
Jennifer Koh (born 1976), American violinist of Korean descent
Jeremy Koh (born 1989), Singaporean operatic tenor

Government and politics
Koh Lay Huan (died 1826), first Kapitan China of Penang
Koh Eng Tian (born 1937), Singaporean lawyer, Solicitor-General (1981–1991)
Tommy Koh (born 1937), Singaporean diplomat and international law specialist
Koh Tsu Koon (born 1949), Malaysian politician from Penang
Howard Koh (born 1952), American public health official of Korean descent
Harold Hongju Koh (born 1954), American lawyer of Korean descent, former State Department advisor
Koh Juat Jong (born ), Singaporean lawyer, Solicitor-General (2008–2014)
Koh Nai Kwong (born 1961), Malaysian politician from Alor Gajah
Lucy Koh (born 1968), American judge of Korean descent
Koh Poh Koon (born 1972), Singaporean politician and colorectal surgeon
Janice Koh (born 1973), Singaporean politician

Popular culture
Koh Chieng Mun (born 1960), Singaporean actress
Dasmond Koh (born 1972), Singaporean actor
Chubby Hubby (born Aun Koh, 1972), Singaporean blogger, son of Tommy Koh
Cynthia Koh (born 1974), Singaporean actress
Shinwon (born Koh Shinwon 고신원, 1995), South Korean singer-songwriter from Pentagon
Sophie Koh (born ), New Zealand-born singer-songwriter
Gerald Koh (born 1984), Singaporean radio personality
Irene Koh (born 1990), South Korean-born comics artist in the United States
Richie Koh (born 1993), Singaporean actor
Ryan Koh, American television writer and producer

Sport
Koh Eng Tong (1921–2006), Malaysian athlete and photographer 
Koh Hock Seng (born 1945), Malaysian field hockey player
Koh Chong Jin (born 1947), Malaysian field hockey player
Koh Eng Kian (born 1956), Singaporean judoka
Koh Chun-son (born 1954), North Korean long-distance runner
Koh Suk-chang (born 1963), South Korean handball player
Shinji Koh (born 1967), Japanese baseball player
Donald Koh (born 1968), Singaporean badminton player
Desmond Koh (born 1973), Singaporean swimmer
Gerald Koh (swimmer) (born 1978), Singaporean swimmer
Koh Seng Leong (born 1983), Singaporean sailor
Terence Koh (sailor) (born 1987), Singaporean sailor
Koh Myong-jin (born 1988), South Korean footballer
Michelle Koh (born 1990), Malaysian golfer
Marcus Koh (born 1993), Singaporean yo-yo performer

Other
Roland Koh (–1972), Malaysian Anglican bishop
Koh Se-kai (born 1934), Taiwanese historian
Koh Seow Chuan (born 1939), Singaporean architect
Koh Boon Hwee (born 1950), Singaporean businessman
Raymond Koh (born 1954), Malaysian pastor abducted in 2017
Koh Gou Young (born 1957), South Korean biologist
Koh Ngiap Yong (1958–2000), Singaporean taxi driver and murder victim
Koh Chai Hong (born 1959), Singaporean pilot
Koh Dong-Jin (born 1961), South Korean businessman, former CEO of Samsung
Koh Buck Song (born 1963), Singaporean writer
Germaine Koh (born 1967), Malaysian-born Canadian conceptual artist
Rena Koh (born ), Malaysian-born British fashion designer
Terence Koh (born 1977), Chinese-born Canadian artist
Cheryl Koh (born ), Singaporean pastry chef
E. J. Koh (born 1988), American writer and translator of Korean descent
Wei Hu Koh, named a Fellow of the Institute of Electrical and Electronics Engineers in 2013

References

Multiple Chinese surnames
Hokkien-language surnames